Dumte Christian Pyagbara (born 13 March 1996) is a Nigerian professional footballer, who plays as a forward.

International career
In January 2014, coach Stephen Keshi, invited Pyagbara to be included in the Nigeria 23-man team for the 2014 African Nations Championship. He helped the team defeat Zimbabwe to a third-place finish, by a goal to nil.

References

External links

1996 births
Living people
Nigerian footballers
Nigeria under-20 international footballers
Nigeria international footballers
Enyimba F.C. players
Sharks F.C. players
Akwa United F.C. players
Rangers International F.C. players
AS Gabès players
Damac FC players
Heartland F.C. players
FK Ventspils players
Al-Sharq Club players
Saudi First Division League players
Latvian Higher League players
Saudi Second Division players
Nigeria A' international footballers
2014 African Nations Championship players
African Games bronze medalists for Nigeria
African Games medalists in football
Association football forwards
Competitors at the 2015 African Games
Nigerian expatriate sportspeople in Tunisia
Expatriate footballers in Tunisia
Nigerian expatriate sportspeople in Saudi Arabia
Expatriate footballers in Saudi Arabia
Nigerian expatriate sportspeople in Latvia
Expatriate footballers in Latvia